is a Japanese football player who plays for FC Ryukyu.

Club statistics
Updated to 23 February 2018.

References

External links

Profile at Roasso Kumamoto

1986 births
Living people
Association football people from Okinawa Prefecture
Japanese footballers
J1 League players
J2 League players
Hokkaido Consadole Sapporo players
FC Tokyo players
Tokushima Vortis players
Roasso Kumamoto players
FC Ryukyu players
Association football midfielders